Cara Hoffman is an American novelist, essayist, and journalist. She is a founding editor of The Anarchist Review of Books and the author of three critically acclaimed novels, So Much Pretty (2011), Be Safe, I Love You (2014), and Running (2017).

Her fiction and essays have been featured in the New York Times, The Paris Review, Rolling Stone, Salon, LitHub, Fifth Estate, Marie Claire, The Daily Beast, Bennington College Review, BOMB Magazine, Teen Vogue and on radio at NPR.

She has been a visiting writer at Goddard College, and St. John’s University, and has lectured at Oxford University's Rhodes Global Scholar's Symposium and at the Renewing The Anarchist Tradition Conference

She taught writing and literature at Bronx Community College, and is an editor at PM Press.

Life and career
Hoffman grew up in Northern Appalachia and in the Rust Belt. She dropped out of high school to travel, working in Europe and the Middle East and did not get an undergraduate degree. In the mid-1990s she became a newspaper reporter covering crime and environmental politics.

In 2009 Hoffman completed an MFA in fiction at Goddard College.

In 2017, she received a MacDowell Fellowship and in 2018 she was named an Edward Albee Fellow.

She founded The Anarchist Review of Books in 2020 with Mattilda Bernstein Sycamore, Carrie Laben, Nick Mamatas, and Marc Lepson.

In 2021 she joined the independent publishing house PM Press as an editor.

She lives in Athens, Greece.

Books

So Much Pretty
So Much Pretty was met with positive reviews. Publishers Weekly gave it a Starred Review, The Los Angeles Times  said, "To say more about Hoffman's constantly surprising story is to reveal too much, but the payoff is more than worth the slow-building suspense".

The New York Times wrote:
 "For all the passion in this intense narrative, Hoffman writes with a restraint that makes poetry of pain. She also shows a mastery of her craft by developing the story over 17 years and narrating it from multiple perspectives. While each has a different take on the horrific events that no one saw coming, the people who live in this insular place remain willfully blind to their own contributions to the deeper causes that made this tragedy almost inevitable".

The New York Times Book Review later called the novel the best suspense novel of 2011.

Be Safe I Love You
Hoffman's second novel was published in April 2014, receiving critical praise and a nomination for the 2015 Folio Prize. George Stephanopoulos interviewed Hoffman about the book for ABC News on August 29, 2014. Library Journal gave it a starred review and called it, "a contemporary version of Tim O’Brien’s The Things They Carried with a female protagonist."

The New York Times Book Review wrote: 
 “A finely tuned piece of fiction . . . Be Safe I Love You is a painful exploration of the devastation wrought by combat even when the person returns from war without a scratch. The story—written with such lucid detail it's hard to believe the main character is an invention—suggests the damage starts long before the soldier reports for duty. . . . In crystalline language that conveys both the desolation of the Iraqi desert and the north country of New York State . . . this book is a reminder that art and love are all that can keep us from despair.”

Hoffman wrote a related op-ed piece on female veterans for the New York Times entitled The Things She Carried which was published on March 31, 2014, and another on the human cost of war for SALON in July 2014.

Be Safe I Love You was selected as a recipient of the 2015 Sundance Institute Global Filmmaking Award. The project will be directed by Haifaa al-Mansour.

Running 
Hoffman's third novel, Running, was published in February 2017 by Simon & Schuster and edited by Ira Silverberg.

On March 17, 2017, Justin Torres wrote in The New York Times Book Review:"Hoffman impressively evokes the combination of nihilism, idealism, rootlessness, psychic and economic necessity, lust and love that might set a young person adrift. Unlike the runaway heroes of many queer narratives these characters are not cast out but looking to get lost...The Athens on display here is peopled with rebels and runaways of all kinds, idealists, revolutionary operatives, con men, wayward young scholars, squatters...In Bridey and Milo Hoffman has created memorable anti-heroes: tough and resourceful scarred, feral and sexy. The book and the characters refuse to conform and Running like all good outlaw literature takes sharp aim at the contemporary culture’s willingness to do so."Running was listed as a New York Times Editor's Choice, a "Most Anticipated Book of 2017" selection by The Millions, one of Entertainment Weekly's "Best New Books" one of Esquire's "Best Books of 2017", and one of Autostraddle's "Queer and Feminist Books to read in 2017"

Ruin 
Hoffman’s fourth literary work is a book of short stories titled Ruin, published by PM Press on April 5, 2022.

References

External links
  Hoffman’s Website

Year of birth missing (living people)
Living people
21st-century American novelists
21st-century American journalists
American women novelists
American women journalists
21st-century American women writers
21st-century American non-fiction writers
Bronx Community College faculty
Anarchist writers
American anarchists